Culex (Culex) fuscocephala is a species of mosquito belonging to the genus Culex. It is found in Indonesia, and Sri Lanka, Bangladesh, Cambodia, China, Guam, Hong Kong, Indonesia, Japan, Laos, Malaysia, Myanmar, Nepal, Pakistan, Philippines, Singapore, Thailand, Timor, and Vietnam. It is a vector of Japanese encephalitis virus.

References 

fuscocephala
Insects described in 1907